Welcome to Fat City is the second studio album by Pennsylvania rock band Crobot, it is the last album to feature brothers Jake & Paul Figuero. It was Released 23 September 2016. They started recording the record in January 2016 with record producer Machine in Texas. They announced the album in June 2016 with the first official single "Not for Sale". They have since then released 3 song including title track "Welcome to Fat City", "Plague of the Mammoths" and new single "Play It Cool".

Track listing

Personnel 
Crobot
 Brandon Yeagley – lead vocals, harmonica
 Chris Bishop – guitars, backing vocals
 Jacob Figueroa – bass, backing vocals
 Paul Figueroa – drums

Additional personnel
 Machine – production, engineering
 Alan Moulder – mixing
 Paul Blakemore – mastering
 D.J. Mackintosh – package design
 Chris Bishop – original artwork

Charts

References 

2016 albums
Crobot albums
Wind-up Records albums